Johann Baptist Ziz (1779–1829) was a German botanist, born in Mainz in  the Rhineland on October 8, 1779. He died in Mainz on December 1, 1829.  The genus Zizia,  which the USDA mentions has three species Zizia aptera, Zizia aurea and Zizia trifoliata, was named for him.

Bibliography
Botanische Arbeitsgemeinschaft Südwestdeutschland

References

19th-century German botanists
1779 births
1829 deaths
Scientists from Mainz